Sinchon is a region of South Korea surrounding Sinchon-dong, Changcheon-dong, Nogosan-dong and Daeheung-dong. It is known for its numerous universities including Yonsei University, Ewha Womans University, Sogang University, Hongik University and Myongji University, as well as its vibrant nightlife.

Transport 
The area is served by subway via Sinchon Station. Also, various Seoul bus lines reach the street.

Shopping 
The biggest shopping mall in Sinchon Station is Hyundai Department Store, which includes 8 Seconds, a Korean SPA brand, PEER, a Korean select shop, Espoir, VDL, both Korean cosmetic brands, and the other fashion and cosmetic brands. Notable Korean cosmetic stores include The Face Shop, The Saem, Aritaum, Etude House, Memebox and Innisfree.  

Seodaemun District
Mapo District
Geography of Seoul
Tourist attractions in Seoul